Ankingameloko is a municipality in Madagascar. It belongs to the district of Ambanja, which is a part of Diana Region. According to 2001 census the population of Ankingameloko was 6,018.

Only primary schooling is available in town. The majority 95% of the population are farmers.  The most important crops are coffee and pepper; also seeds of catechu is an important agricultural product. Services provide employment for 1% of the population. Additionally fishing employs 4% of the population.

References and notes 

Populated places in Diana Region